SMA5 or variant, may refer to:

Sekolah Menengah Atas 5 (High School #5)
 SMA Negeri 5 Bandung (Bandung State H.S. #5), a public (i.e. state) high school in Bandung, West Java, Java Island, Indonesia
 SMA Negeri 5 Parepare (Parepare State H.S. #5), a public (ie. state) high school in Parepare, South Sulawesi, Sulawesi Island, Indonesia

See also
 SMAS (disambiguation)
 SMA (disambiguation)